Mario Gila Fuentes (born 29 August 2000) is a Spanish professional footballer who plays as a centre-back for Serie A club Lazio.

Club career

Real Madrid Castilla
Gila is a youth product of various clubs in Catalonia, including Santa Perpètua, Sabadell, Mollet, Damm and Espanyol. He moved to Real Madrid's youth academy in 2018, signing a contract until 2024. He was promoted to their reserves in 2019 where he became their stalwart and vice captain under Raúl.

Real Madrid
Gila made his professional debut with the senior Real Madrid squad in a 4–0 La Liga win over Espanyol, coming on as a substitute in the 75th minute.

Lazio 
On 12 July 2022, Lazio announced his signing from Real Madrid for €6m.

International career
Gila was called up to a preliminary Spain U19 training camp before the 2019 UEFA European Under-19 Championship.

Honours
Real Madrid
La Liga: 2021–22

References

External links
Real Madrid profile

2000 births
Living people
Footballers from Barcelona
Spanish footballers
Association football defenders
Real Madrid CF players
Real Madrid Castilla footballers
S.S. Lazio players
La Liga players
Primera Federación players
Serie A players
Spain under-21 international footballers
Spanish expatriate footballers
Expatriate footballers in Italy
Spanish expatriate sportspeople in Italy